The Parima Mountains (Spanish: Sierra Parima, Portuguese: Serra Parima) are a mountain range of the Guiana Shield in South America. 

All the water on their western side drains into the Orinoco, which rises itself in the Parima Mountains as well. All the water on their eastern side drains into the Branco River, which ultimately empties into the Rio Negro, which in turn empties into the Amazon.

The Parima Mountains belong to the settlement areas of the Yanomami.

See also
 Parima Tapirapecó National Park

References

Mountain ranges of Brazil
Mountain ranges of Venezuela